Yurchi-ye Sharqi Rural District is in Kuraim District of Nir County, Ardabil province, Iran. At the census of 2006, its population was 2,962 in 543 households; there were 2,473 inhabitants in 628 households at the following census of 2011; and in the most recent census of 2016, the population of the rural district was 2,112 in 570 households. The largest of its 26 villages was Qurtulmush, with 406 people.

References 

Nir County

Rural Districts of Ardabil Province

Populated places in Ardabil Province

Populated places in Nir County